Krzysztof Sikora may refer to:
 Krzysztof Gustaw Sikora (born 1954) - Chairperson of the Kuyavian-Pomeranian Regional Assembly (since 2006)
 Krzysztof Ryszard Sikora (born 1959) - Member of Polish Sejm V Term (2005–2007)
Krzysztof Sikora (footballer) from Polonia Słubice